The use of art in dementia care is a valuable tool in enriching the lives of people with dementia.

Background
Being engaged with visual and performing arts provides opportunities for people with dementia to express themselves creatively. Through the process of creating an image or participating in a song for example, a person with dementia may access long or short term memories. Being engaged in the arts may provide an access to emotions, self-exploration, thoughts, dreams and hopes.

While scientists are racing to find a cure, according to the Alzheimer Society of Canada, about half a million Canadians were living with dementia in 2009. The arts provide a non-pharmaceutical approach that helps alleviate anxiety and confusion and provide some respite for people with dementia and their caregivers. Being engaged in the arts is a positive way of maintaining or improving one's quality of life, especially those who live with dementia.

Films on art and dementia
The documentary film I Remember Better When I Paint examines the way creative arts bypass the limitations of dementias such as Alzheimer's disease. The film highlights how patients' still-vibrant imaginations are strengthened through therapeutic art.

See also
 Caring for people with dementia
 The Society for the Arts in Dementia Care

References

Dementia
Art therapy